Billy Booth may refer to:
Billy Booth (actor) (1949–2006), American child actor on the sitcom Dennis the Menace
Billy Joe Booth (1940–1972), Canadian football player in the Canadian Football League
Billy Booth (footballer) (1886–1963), English football centre half